Gabriel Bosoi (born 11 August 1987) is a Romanian professional footballer who plays as a defender for Prima Categoria Marche side ASD Lunano Calcio.

Honours
CF Brăila
Liga III: 2009–10

Studențesc Iași
Liga II: 2013–14

References

External links
 
 

1987 births
Living people
People from Brăila County
Romanian footballers
Association football defenders
Liga I players
Liga II players
AFC Dacia Unirea Brăila players
FC Politehnica Iași (2010) players
Romanian expatriate footballers
Romanian expatriate sportspeople in Italy
Expatriate footballers in Italy